The Danish Athletics Federation (Danish: Dansk Atletik Forbund) is the governing body for the sport of athletics in Denmark.

Affiliations 
World Athletics
European Athletic Association (EAA)
National Olympic Committee and Sports Confederation of Denmark

National records 
DAF maintains the Danish records in athletics.

External links 
Official webpage

Denmark
Athletics
National governing bodies for athletics